is the debut single by J-pop group Yoshimotozaka46. The single was released on 26 December 2018, three months after the group's roster was finalized. The song is written with a Kansai dialect and features Tsukasa Saito and Haruna Ogawa, both owarai comedians, in the center position.

Release 
The single was released in two versions, a DVD edition and a regular edition. The DVD edition includes a separate DVD with the music videos of "Nakasete Kure yo" and "Kimi no Kuchibiru o Hanasanai". Each regular edition had a different member of Yoshimotozaka46 printed on the cover. A contest was held to determine which member's version would sell the most copies, which was won by Haruna Ogawa.

Track listing 
All lyrics written by Yasushi Akimoto.

DVD edition

Regular Edition

Weekly chart performance
Oricon

Billboard Japan

References

2018 debut singles
2018 songs
Japanese-language songs
Yoshimotozaka46 songs